Estelle Louise Jensen (25 May 1888 – 10 January 1962) was an American plant pathologist.

Early life 
On May 25, 1888, Jensen was born as Estelle Louise Jensen in Minneapolis, Minnesota.

Education 
Jensen received an A.B. degree from the University of Minnesota in 1909 and an A.M. degree from Smith College in 1910.

Career 
From 1912 to 1913, Jensen was a xylotomist for the recently formed Forest Products Laboratory of the Department of Agriculture. 
During the period 1913–1917, Jensen was an instructor in mycology for the University of Minnesota and a researcher at the Minnesota Agricultural Experiment Station. Her research interests included imperfect fungi that are pathogens of cereals.

Personal life 
In 1917, Jensen married Elvin C. Stakman, a professor. They have no children.

On January 10, 1962, Jensen died suddenly and unexpectedly in Minnesota. Jensen was 73.
Jensen is buried as Louise Jensen Stakman at Sunset Memorial Park Cemetery in Minneapolis, Minnesota.

Selected publications

References

Bibliography

External links
 Sigma Fi diploma for Elvin Charles and Louise Estelle Stakman, 1906, 1909
 Finding aid, Elvin C. Stakman papers, 1918-1973
 

1888 births
1962 deaths
American phytopathologists
Women phytopathologists
American women scientists
University of Minnesota alumni
Smith College alumni